Clancy of the Mounted (1933) is an American pre-Code Universal movie serial based on the poem "Clancy of the Mounted Police" by Robert W. Service, directed by Ray Taylor. Tom Tyler played Sgt. Clancy, and William L. Thorne played the villainous claim jumper, Black McDougal.

This was Universal's 85th serial and the 17th with sound. Though long considered lost, the first six chapters were released on DVD by Hermitage Hill Media in 2012; According to MDB the British Film Institute (BFI) holds a 35mm print of all 12 chapters in completion

Plot
Sergeant Tom Clancy, of the North-West Mounted Police, is assigned to arrest his own brother Steve, who has been framed for murdering a neighbor by "Black" McDougal and Pierre LaRue.

Cast
Tom Tyler as Sergeant Tom Clancy
Jacqueline Wells as Ann Laurie
William Desmond as Dave Moran
Francis Ford as Inspector Cabot
Tom London as Constable McGregor
Edmund Cobb as Constable McIntosh
William L. Thorne as "Black" McDougal, outlaw and claim jumper
Rosalie Roy as Maureen Clancy
Earl McCarthy as Steve (Tom Clancy's brother)
 Iron Eyes Cody as Indian
 Steve Clemente as Patouche
 Frank Lackteen as Wolf Fang
 Leon Beauman as Pierre LaRue (credited as Leon Duval)

Chapter titles
 Toll of the Rapids
 Brother Against Brother
 Ambuscade
 The Storm
 A Desperate Chance
 The Wolf's Fangs
 The Night Attack
 Crashing Timbers
 Fingerprints
 The Breed Strikes
 The Crimson Jacket
 Journey's End
Source:

See also
 List of American films of 1933
List of film serials by year
List of film serials by studio

References

External links

1933 films
Northern (genre) films
American black-and-white films
1930s English-language films
Films based on poems
Universal Pictures film serials
Films directed by Ray Taylor
Fictional Royal Canadian Mounted Police officers
Films based on works by Robert W. Service